Bange is a surname. It may refer to:

Alessandra Bange-Hall (born 1986), U.S. snowshoer
Charles Ragon de Bange (1833–1914), French polytechnician and artillery colonel
Jackie Bange (born ?), U.S. television news anchor and reporter

See also
Baingoin County (Chinese: 班戈县; Pinyin transliteration: Bāngé Xiàn), in Tibet Autonomous Region, PRC